En Avant Estuaire FC, is a Gabonese football club based in Libreville.

It was founded in 1986 in the capital Libreville with the name Delta Sports, and they have changed their name several times, which have been:

Chronology of names

SP:NWH

600,938,569

Achievements
UNIFFAC Clubs Cup: 1
 2005

Coupe du Gabon Interclubs: 1
 2006

External links
Team profile 

Football clubs in Gabon
Football clubs in Libreville
2002 establishments in Gabon
Association football clubs established in 2002